DeWayne Mathew Vaughn (born July 22, 1959) is a former Major League Baseball pitcher who played in  with the Texas Rangers.

External links

1959 births
Living people
Baseball players from Oklahoma
Major League Baseball pitchers
Texas Rangers players
Sportspeople from Oklahoma City
Jackson Mets players
Little Falls Mets players
Lynchburg Mets players
Oklahoma City 89ers players
Shelby Mets players
Tidewater Tides players